Ping Pong over the Abyss is the debut album by the 77s, released in 1982 on the Exit Records label.

One song from that album, "Renaissance Man", was later recorded by the Ocean Blue. "It's So Sad" was later rerecorded, with a drastically different arrangement, by Roe's other band, the Lost Dogs, for their album MUTT.

The title comes from Allen Ginsberg's poem "Howl", section 3: "I'm with you in Rockland / where you scream in a straight jacket that you're losing the game of the actual ping pong of the abyss."

Track listing

Side one
 "A Different Kind of Light"'
 "How Can You Love"
 "It's So Sad"
 "Falling Down a Hole"
 "Someone New"

Side two
 "Renaissance Man"
 "Ping Pong Over the Abyss"
 "Time Is Slipping Away"
 "Denomination Blues (That's All)"

Bonus tracks (CD)
Bonus tracks originally found on CDs in the 123 boxset.

 "A Different Kind of Light" (Live) 
 "How Can You Love" (4-track demo) 
 "It's So Sad" (Live) 
 "Falling Down a Hole" (Live) 
 "Ping Pong Over the Abyss" (4-track demo) 
 "Denomination Blues" (Live)

Band members
 Mike Roe - guitar, lead vocals
 Mark Tootle - keyboards, guitar, vocals
 Jan Eric - bass, background vocals
 Mark Proctor - drums, vocals

References 

1982 debut albums
The 77s albums